Selma is an unincorporated community in northwestern Van Buren County, Iowa, United States.  It lies along Iowa Highway 16 northwest of the city of Keosauqua, the county seat of Van Buren County.  Its elevation is 617 feet (188 m).

History
 Although Selma is unincorporated, it has a post office with the ZIP code of 52588.  The post office was originally opened as the Hickory post office on 10 September 1874, and its name was changed to Selma on 24 April 1882.

Selma's population was 275 in 1925.

References

External links
http://iavanburen.org/history/douds-selma1968book/HistoryOfDouds-Selma.html
https://web.archive.org/web/20091017062240/http://www.villagesofvanburen.com/index.htm

Unincorporated communities in Van Buren County, Iowa
Unincorporated communities in Iowa
1874 establishments in Iowa
Populated places established in 1874